Douglas R. Cavener is an American biologist, a Professor of Biology and the former Verne M. Willaman Dean Professor of Science at Eberly College of Science, Pennsylvania State University, and also a published author, being widely cited and widely held in libraries.

Awards and honors 
 1981 Theodosius Dobzhansky Prize
 2014 Fellow of the American Association for the Advancement of Science

Select publications

References

Year of birth missing (living people)
Living people
American science writers
Pennsylvania State University faculty
21st-century American biologists